In the geologic timescale, the Telychian is the age of the  Llandovery Epoch of the Silurian Period of the Paleozoic Era of the Phanerozoic Eon. The Telychian Age was between 438.5 ± 1.2 million years ago (Ma) and 433.4 ± 0.8 Ma. The Telychian Age succeeds the Aeronian Age and precedes the Sheinwoodian Age. The name of the interval is derived from the Pen-lan-Telych Farm near Llandovery, Powys, Wales. The GSSP is located within the Wormwood Formation.

It ended with the Ireviken event.

Ireviken event 

The Ireviken event was the first of three relatively minor extinction events (the Ireviken, Mulde, and Lau events) during the Silurian Period. It occurred at the Llandovery/Wenlock boundary (mid Silurian). The event is best recorded at Ireviken, Gotland, where over 50% of trilobite species became extinct; 80% of the global conodont species also become extinct in this interval.

Anatomy of the event 
The event lasted around 200,000 years, spanning the base of the Wenlock Epoch.

It comprises eight extinction "datum points"—the first four being regularly spaced, every 30,797 years, and linked to the Milankovic obliquity cycle. The fifth and sixth probably reflect maxima in the precessional cycles, with periods of around 16.5 and 19 ka. The final two data are much further spaced, so harder to link with Milankovic changes.

Effects 
The mechanism responsible for the event originated in the deep oceans, and made its way into the shallower shelf seas. Correspondingly, shallow-water reefs were barely affected, while pelagic and hemipelagic organisms such as the graptolites, conodonts and trilobites were hit hardest.

Geochemistry 
Subsequent to the first extinctions, excursions in the δ13C and δ18O records are observed; δ13C rises from +1.4‰ to +4.5‰, while δ18O increases from −5.6‰ to −5.0‰.

References 

 
Llandovery epoch
Silurian geochronology